Heidi Becker-Ramlow (21 November 1954 – 13 February 1987) was a German diver. She won the 3m springboard event at the 1970 European Aquatics Championships, and competed at the 1972 Summer Olympics and the 1976 Summer Olympics. Becker-Ramlow committed suicide in 1987 after her husband left her for another woman.

References

1954 births
1987 suicides
German female divers
Olympic divers of East Germany
Divers at the 1972 Summer Olympics
Divers at the 1976 Summer Olympics
Sportspeople from Rostock
Suicides in Germany
20th-century German women